Conception Island may refer to:
 Conception Island, Bahamas
 Conception Island, Seychelles

See also
 Conception (disambiguation)